House of Anvers is a chocolatier company in Latrobe, Tasmania, Australia. It was founded in 1989, by Igor van Gerwen, a Belgian-born chocolatier. It moved into its present location on the Bass Highway in 2002. House of Anvers is the only Australian stockist of Fortunato No. 4, Nacional cocoa chocolate.

House of Anvers sells its chocolate in independent chocolate shops and IGA supermarkets, as well as at a purpose built store in Latrobe and chocolate themed restaurant. It is also a sponsor and host of Latrobe Chocolate Winterfest annually. House of Anvers are the favourite chocolates of the Belgium ambassador to Australia, Marc Mullie. House of Anvers was the first location to offer an electric vehicle charging point in Northern Tasmania.

References

External links

Australian brands
Australian chocolate companies
Companies based in Tasmania
Retail companies established in 1989
Australian companies established in 1989
Food and drink companies established in 1989
Chocolateries